"I've Been Watching You" is a song by American hip hop artist Father MC which features Lady Kazan. The song was recorded for Father MC's debut album Father's Day and released as the fourth and final single for the album in August 1991.

Track listing
12", 33 RPM, CD, Vinyl (Promo)
"I've Been Watching You" (Daddy Radio) - 4:03
"I've Been Watching You" (Album Version) - 3:43
"I've Been Watching You" (Redhead Kingpin Remix) - 3:42
"I've Been Watching You" (Fresh Gordon Remix) - 3:55
"I've Been Watching You" (Redhead Kingpin Instrumental) - 3:30

Personnel
Information taken from Discogs.
executive production – Sean "Puffy" Combs, Andre Harrell
production – Fresh Gordon
remixing – Sean "Puffy" Combs, Fresh Gordon, Redhead Kingpin
writing – Fresh Gordon, Lil' Shawn

Chart performance

Notes

1991 singles
Father MC songs
1990 songs
Uptown Records singles